Aykut Anhan (born 16 December 1985), known by his stage name Haftbefehl (meaning "arrest warrant" in German), is a German rapper. He was signed to his own record label Azzlack, before signing with the label Echte Musik.

Biography 
Haftbefehl was born Aykut Anhan in Offenbach am Main, West Germany, on 16 December 1985. He grew up in a Turkish-speaking household, raised by a Turkish mother (from Giresun) and a Zaza–Kurdish father from East Turkish province Tunceli. By Anhan's own account, he dropped out of school after his father's suicide which happened when he was 14. In 2006, he fled to Istanbul because of an impending imprisonment concerning drug trafficking; from there he moved to the Netherlands and lived in Amsterdam and Arnhem. Along the way he wrote his first lyrics. After his return to his hometown Offenbach, he began working as a vehicle mechanic. After three weeks he quit and subsequently began running a betting shop.

After that he started recording his first songs. When Samson Jones, the owner of the label Echte Musik, heard Haftbefehl's songs, he was assured of his skills and gave him a contract. Haftbefehl was involved with eight contributions at the sampler Kapitel 1: Zeit für was Echtes. He also gained attention by bis contribution on the sampler La Connexion and on singles from fellow rappers Kollegah and Manuellsen.

On 29 October 2010, Haftbefehl released his first album called Azzlack Stereotyp, which reached 59 on MusicLine's Top 100 chart on 15 November 2010. After the closing of the label Echte Musik he launched his own label called Azzlacks.

In Spring 2012, Haftbefehl released his second album, Kanackiş, which contains songs with other famous German musicians like Jan Delay and Sido. On the 15th anniversary of the death of American rapper The Notorious B.I.G., the splash! magazine released a mixtape named The Notorious H.A.F.T.

With the single Chabos wissen wer der Babo ist, Haftbefehl entered the German single charts for the first time.

Haftbefehl married in 2016 and currently has two children. His younger brother is also a rapper, who goes under the moniker Capo. His older brother, Aytac, was sentenced to four years in prison for bank robbery in 2017.

Discography 

 Albums
 2010: Azzlack Stereotyp
 2012: Kanackiş
 2013: Blockplatin
 2014: Russisch Roulette
 2015: Unzensiert
 2016: Der Holland Job (with Xatar)
 2020: Das weisse Album
 2021: Das schwarze Album
 2022: Mainpark Baby

 Singles
 2010: Gestern Gallus, heute Charts (E-Single)
 2013: Chabos wissen wer der Babo ist
 2014: Saudi Arabi Money Rich
 2014: Lass die Affen aus'm Zoo (feat. K.I.Z)
 2014: Ich rolle mit meim Besten (Babos Remix) (feat. Marteria)
 2015: Mama (mit MoTrip)
 2015: CopKKKilla
 2015: Depressionen im Ghetto
2020: Conan x Xenia (feat. Shirin David)
 
 Sampler
 2009: Kapitel eins: Zeit für was Echtes)

 Mixtapes
 2012: The Notorious H.A.F.T.

 EPs

 Azzlack Kommandant (JUICE Exclusive)

Awards and nominations

Results

References

External links 
 Video interview, May 2010

German rappers
1985 births
Living people
German people of Turkish descent
German people of Kurdish descent
People from Offenbach am Main